Guillermo Coria was the defending champion, but did not compete this year.

Nicolás Massú won the title by defeating Gastón Gaudio 7–6(7–3), 6–4 in the final.

Seeds
All seeds received a bye to the second round.

Draw

Finals

Top half

Section 1

Section 2

Bottom half

Section 3

Section 4

References

External links
 Main draw (ATP)
 Qualifying draw (ATP)
 ITF tournament profile

Singles
Austrian Open Kitzbühel